"Adrenalize" is a song by American rock band In This Moment. Released on February 1, 2013, it is the second single released from their fourth studio album, Blood.

Music video
The music video for "Adrenalize", directed by Robert John Kley, was released on April 9, 2013 and filmed at Linda Vista Community Hospital in Los Angeles. The video features Maria Brink being drugged by a masked nurse while tied to a hospital bed, the band performing throughout the facility, scantily clad men and women in animal and plain white masks (the latter are seen on the Blood album cover) partying and making out, and a black angel wandering the halls. The video ends with Brink becoming a new nurse.

The video was nominated for the Jack Richardson Producer of the Year Award.

Personnel
Maria Brink – lead vocals, piano
Chris Howorth – lead guitar, backing vocals
Randy Weitzel – rhythm guitar
Travis Johnson - bass guitar
Tom Hane – drums, percussions
Ivan Moody — additional vocals

Charts

Certifications

References

2012 songs
2013 singles
Century Media Records singles
In This Moment songs